P. K. Dave (1 January 1923  19 September 2006) was an Indian bureaucrat, civil servant, former Chief secretary of Jammu and Kashmir state and 15th lieutenant Governor of Delhi, served in office for over five years from 1992 to 1997.

Education
He graduated from the Institute of Science, Nagpur, and later he was selected as an Indian Administrative Service (IAS) officer.

Career
In 1967, he was first appointed as Chief Secretary to the government of Jammu and Kashmir until 1971, and later he served as Petroleum Secretary from 1971 to 1976. From 1976 to 1977, he served as Advisor to the governor of Tamil Nadu, and also Ambassador to Brussels from 1977 to 1981. He also served as Deputy Secretary to the government of Madhya Pradesh for Planning department until he retired in 1981.

In 2004, he was awarded Lifetime Achievement award in recognition of his service to the oil industry of India.

Death 
Deva was suffering from a medical condition. He died on 19 September 2006 in a hospital in Delhi following his chronic condition.

References 

1923 births
2006 deaths
Ambassadors of India to Belgium
Lieutenant Governors of Delhi
Indian Administrative Service officers
Missing middle or first names